Cugini Randi was a small Italian manufacturer of agricultural machinery in the 1940s–1980s.

History 
Cugini Randi was formed at the end of the Second World War, presumably in 1947. Its headquarters were in Bagnacavallo in the province of Ravenna. The factory was founded by brothers Umberto and Dardano Randi, along with his cousin Ettore Randi. They started the business repairing machines, then building, with recycled materials, circular saws sold to some local carpenters and used by them until the end of the 90s (nearly 40 years of service). Subsequently, the factory began to transform American and English military tracked motor vehicles, left by the Allies after the end of the war, in tracked agriculture tractors. They adapted petrol 8 cylinder engines in order to operate with agricultural oil. Umberto, an expert engineer trained in Autocentro Militare in Bologna, invented, for this purpose, an oil agriculture vaporizer, using war materials remnants (shells of large caliber bullets and a series of copper tubes). In light of the success of the early fifties, the company began to produce real wheeled tractors of medium size (models R14 - R50), and made almost all the pieces needed for their construction. At the same time, Cugini Randi began to produce their first motocultivator as well as some machines such as the "Grillo" and the tiller R5. At the end of the 50s, Umberto died. Dardano and Ettore  continued to work in the agriculture sector, diversifying the production. They started building steering boxes for different types of vehicles (construction machinery, etc.), they abandoned the production of medium-sized tractors and focused the production in tiller, motocultivators and small 4-wheel drive tractors.

During the maximum production years (70s and 80s), the Cugini Randi had a decent network of representatives in Italy and a presence in Portugal, Greece and Belgium. Due to a very strong competition (with much greater production capacity), a professional machines of the type produced drop in demand, and a lack of a generational change, around the mid-80s, Cugini Randi company gradually ceased the activities, leaving the management of spare parts to its employees.

The transformations (late 40s) 

Tracked tractors obtained by processing military tracked motor vehicles. Adapted American and English military tracked motor vehicles left by the Allies after the end of the war. The engines, petrol 8 cylinder engines were adapted in order to operate with agricultural oil. Umberto, an expert engineer trained in autocentro Militare di Bologna, invented an oil agriculture vaporizer, using remnants of war materials (shells of large caliber bullets and a series of copper tubes). The ignition occurred with petrol fuel. Once ignited, the agricultural oil vaporizator started its work.

Products (50s)

Tractors

R28 - R30 - R32 Tractors: equipped with SPA petrol engines, adapted to work with agricultural oil
T50 Tractor: equipped with OM CR1D HP50 diesel engine, the same engine fitted by OM Taurus trucks.
R22 - R30 - R32 Tractors: equipped with VM (Vancini Martelli) diesel engines
R14 - R25 - R25SV - R35 Tractors:  equipped with Deutz HP11-24-32 (F2L514) two-cylinder engines. R25SV was of smaller dimensions in order to easily work among the orchards. R35 was designed in such a way that on the same frame it was possible to build a tracked HP30-45 version. These tracked vehicles, announced in 1954, never entered the production cycle.
R50 Tractors:  equipped with Deutz HP 50 three-cylinder diesel motors.

Tillers and motocultivators
2500 and 3000 Motocultivator: Lombardini or Slanzi or Ruggerini oil engine. 4 + 4 gearbox. It was the first two-wheeled motocultivator designed and manufactured by Cugini Randi company. No PTO were provided.

The "Grillo"
The Grillo was built around the year 1953. It was a mower with transport capabilities, along with spraying capacity. He was born in a period in which there was an absolute lack of machines. It was fully functional, capable of accomplishment all of these tasks simultaneously

Products (60s)

Small tractors
R4 Tractor: equipped with Lombardini HP15 or Slanzi HP18,5 gasoline / diesel engines. 4-wheel drive, articulated.

Motocultivators
2500, 3000, 3500, 4000 Motocultivators: Lombardini or Slanzi or Ruggerini oil engine. 4 + 4 gearbox. The original color adopted by these machines was grey-red instead of the classic green-white adopted later and during the 70s and 80s.

Tillers 
R-5 Tiller: two-stroke Minarelli HP5 petrol engine.

Products  (70s and 80s)

Small tractors
R418 - R424 Tractors: equipped with Lombardini HP21 or Slanzi HP26 -30 gasoline / diesel engines. Low specific weight, strong adhesion, low center of gravity, 4-wheel drive, articulated. Qualities that allowed the machine to be the winner of the 1st Prize at the 6th concorso antinfortunistico ENPI (Ente Nazionale Prevenzione Infortuni)  for machines to be used on sloping ground

Motocultivators
2500 and 3000 Motocultivator: Lombardini or Slanzi or Ruggerini oil engine. 4 + 4 gearbox. It was the first two-wheeled motocultivator designed and manufactured by Cugini Randi company. No PTO were provided.
2500 super and 3600 Motocultivator: Lombardini HP18-21 or Slanzi HP26-30 petrol / diesel engine. 6-speed gearbox. Equipped with spherical differential locking, reverse gear, adjustable handlebar, two PTO, one of which synchronized with the transmission. Also available with powered trailer version.
4000 Motocultivator: similar to 3600 Series but with 4-speed gearbox.
650 Motocultivator: Lombardini HP13-11-10 petrol / diesel engine. Equipped with differential lock, reverse gear, adjustable and reversible handle bar, two PTO, one of which synchronized with the transmission. Cutter bar version and powered trailer version also available.
6000 Junior Motocultivator: Lombardini or Ruggerini HP14-16 diesel engine. Equipped with differential lock, reversing safety mechanism, adjustable handlebar, two PTO. Also available with powered trailer version. The safety mechanism, invented, designed and finally adopted by Cugini Randi, first on the 6000 Junior and then adopted across the range, allowed the model to be the winner of the 1st Prize at the 6th competition antinfortunistico ENPI (Ente Nazionale Prevenzione Infortuni)  for machines to be used on sloping ground. The mechanism allowed to engage the reverse gear, but the motocultivator was enabled to retreat only if the cutter was disengaged. A version with a third independent PTO for the Portuguese market was produced. The motocultivators were also painted with red color instead of the traditional green color.
6000 Super Motocultivator: Lombardini HP14-16-18P diesel engine. Equipped with spherical differential locking, reversing safety mechanism, adjustable handlebar, two PTO, one of which is synchronized with the transmission. Also available with powered trailer version.

Tillers 
R-4 Tiller: two-stroke petrol engine HP4
R-7 Tiller: two-stroke petrol engine HP7
R-8 Tiller: two-stroke petrol or diesel engine HP8
R-6M Tiller: two-stroke Minarelli HP6 petrol engine. In practice, a small, lightweight, two drive wheels motocultivator, able to work with a single wheel in all interrow crops
R-2000 Tiller: 4-strokes Lombardini HP10-14 petrol / diesel engine. Equipped with a safety reverse mechanism, allowing the machine to stop in the space of a few centimeters. The safety mechanism, invented, designed and finally adopted by Cugini Randi across the range of their tillers, allowed the model to be the winner of the 1st Prize at the 6th competition antinfortunistico ENPI (Ente Nazionale Prevenzione Infortuni)  for machines to be used on sloping ground. The safety mechanism was designed to enter immediately in operation and in case of breakage of the clutch cable too.

Steering boxes
Steering boxes model G5 - 267, G5 - 267 ROV., G5 - 250, G5 - 279, G5 - 279 ROV., G14 - 558, G14 - 558 ROV., G14 - 535

References

External links

Photo galleries 
 Production during the 40s
 Production during the 50s
 Production during the 60s 
 Production during the 70s and 80s

Videos 

R35 tractor
Teresio Vitozzi, R25 and Landini Testacalda tractors

Bibliography
 
 

Italian brands
Defunct companies of Italy